Arthur Belyea (31 August 1885 – 6 January 1968) was a Canadian rower. He competed in the men's single sculls event at the 1924 Summer Olympics.

References

External links
 

1885 births
1968 deaths
Canadian male rowers
Olympic rowers of Canada
Rowers at the 1924 Summer Olympics
Sportspeople from Saint John, New Brunswick
Canadian emigrants to the United States